The third season of House (also called House, M.D.) ran on FOX from September 5, 2006 to May 29, 2007. Early in the season, House temporarily regains the use of his leg due to ketamine treatment after he was shot in the season two finale. Later in the season, he leaves a stubborn patient in an exam room with a thermometer in his rectum. Because House is unwilling to apologize, the patient, who turns out to be a police detective, starts an investigation around House's Vicodin addiction. 

David Morse joined the cast for seven episodes as the detective, Michael Tritter. He was cast for the role after having previously worked with House creator David Shore on CBS' Hack.

Cast and characters

Main cast 
 Hugh Laurie as Dr. Gregory House
 Lisa Edelstein as Dr. Lisa Cuddy
 Omar Epps as Dr. Eric Foreman
 Robert Sean Leonard as Dr. James Wilson
 Jennifer Morrison as Dr. Allison Cameron
 Jesse Spencer as Dr. Robert Chase

Recurring cast 
 David Morse as Detective Michael Tritter
 Stephanie Venditto as Nurse Brenda Previn
 Kadeem Hardison as lawyer Howard Gemeiner
 Leighton Meester as  Ali
 Edward Edwards as Richard McNeil
 Ron Perkins as Dr. Ron Simpson
 Charles S. Dutton as Rodney Foreman
 Kimberly Quinn as Nurse Wendy

Guest cast 
Jane Adams, Erich Anderson, Omar Avila, Jurnee Smollett-Bell, Geoffrey Blake, Tanner Blaze, Ben Bledsoe, Marc Blucas, Mika Boorem, Kacie Borrowman, David Bowe, Paula Cale, Helen Carey, Greg Cipes, Monique Gabriela Curnen, Dabier, Meredith Eaton, Mary Elizabeth Ellis, Shonda Farr, Arabella Field, Colleen Flynn, Lyndsy Fonseca, Thomas Mikal Ford, Patrick Fugit, Carla Gallo, Christopher Gartin, Jason Winston George, Skyler Gisondo, Meta Golding, Meagan Good, Eve Gordon, Joel Grey, Tracy Howe, Carter Jenkins, Dustin Joiner, Heather Kafka, Krista Kalmus, Tory Kittles, Clare Kramer, Deborah Lacey, Nick Lane, John Larroquette, Brian Leckner, Sheryl Lee, Geoffrey Lewis, Braeden Lemasters, Tess Lina, Jodi Long, Donald Sage Mackey, Bailee Madison, Wendy Makkena, Stephan Markle, Dave Matthews, Shyann McClure, Michael Medico, Joel David Moore, Zeb Newman, Jenny O'Hara, Slade Pearce, Piper Perabo, Adina Porter, Kathleen Quinlan, Annie Quinn, Anne Ramsay, Mercedes Renard, Jake Richardson, Tyson Ritter, Jenny Robertson, Alan Rosenberg, Vyto Ruginis, Dustin Seavey, Alyssa Shafer, Kurtwood Smith, Tony Spiridakis, Josh Stamberg, Cassi Thomson, Cooper Thornton, Beverly Todd, Mandy June Turpin, Raviv Ullman, Pruitt Taylor Vince, Jascha Washington, Damien Dante Wayans, Katheryn Winnick and Jamison Yang.

Reception 
Season three's most-viewed episode was "One Day, One Room", which was watched by almost 27.4 million viewers. An average 19.4 million viewers watched season three of House, making it the seventh most-watched show of the 2006–2007 television season.

Jennifer Morrison and Joel Grey submitted the episode "Informed Consent" for consideration in the categories of Outstanding Supporting Actress in a Drama Series and Outstanding Guest Actor in a Drama Series respectively at the 59th Primetime Emmy Awards. Neither was nominated.

John Larroquette and David Morse submitted the episode "Son of Coma Guy" for consideration in the category of Outstanding Guest Actor in a Drama Series. Morse was nominated. Lisa Edelstein also submitted this episode for consideration in the category of Outstanding Supporting Actress in a Drama Series. She did not receive a nomination.

The episode "Half-Wit" was submitted for consideration in the categories of Outstanding Drama Series, Outstanding Writing for a Drama Series (for Lawrence Kaplow), and Outstanding Lead Actor in a Drama Series (for Hugh Laurie). The series and Laurie received nominations.

Omar Epps submitted the episode "House Training" for consideration in the category of Outstanding Supporting Actor in a Drama Series. He was not nominated.

Episodes

DVD releases

References 
General
 
 

Specific

Further reading

External links 

 
 House recaps at televisionwithoutpity.com
 House episodes information at film.com
 List of House episodes at TVGuide.com
 

 
2006 American television seasons
2007 American television seasons